Erebus intermedia is a moth of the family Erebidae. It is found in Asia, including the Bismarck Archipelago and Sulawesi.

References

Moths described in 1900
Erebus (moth)